Andrew Muir may refer to:

Andrew Muir (chess player), Scottish chess player
Andrew Muir (politician), member of the Alliance Party of Northern Ireland

See also
Andrew Muirhead, 15th-century bishop of Glasgow